Siddharth Kishorkumar Trivedi (born 4 September 1982) is an Indian cricketer who represented Gujarat. Currently, he plays for Saurashtra cricket team on his return to domestic circuit.

Domestic career

Trivedi is right-handed batsman and a right-arm medium pace bowler. He made his first class debut in 2002–03. He played for West Zone in the Duleep Trophy, for Gujarat cricket team in the Ranji Trophy and for the Rajasthan Royals in the Indian Premier League. He returned to domestic in 2014 after completing ban of 1 year. He joined Saurashtra cricket team on his return to domestic circuit.

Under 19 career

He played in Under 19 Cricket World Cup in 2002 for India. He has been called up to an Indian emerging players tour to Australia in July.

Indian Premier League

In the Indian Premier League, he played for the Rajasthan Royals, who won the 2008 competition. Trivedi is Rajasthan's highest wicket taker in the IPL, with 65 wickets.

Ban 

In 2013, Trivedi was banned for 1 year after he failed to report that bookies approached him, even though he had no involvement in match fixing or spot fixing during the IPL corruption scandal in 2013.

References

External links

1982 births
Living people
Indian cricketers
Rajasthan Royals cricketers
West Zone cricketers
Gujarat cricketers
Saurashtra cricketers
India Red cricketers
India Blue cricketers
Cricketers from Ahmedabad
Cricketers banned for corruption